Santosh Rana is an Indian politician, belonging to the Communist Party of India. He studied at Bhattar College at Danton, graduating with a B.A. in 1969.

He contested the Tamluk seat in the 2001 West Bengal legislative assembly election, and  finished in second place with 44.45% of the votes.

He won  the Medinipur seat in the 2006 West Bengal legislative assembly election, but lost it in 2011.

References

External links
Interview with Mera Neta 

Living people
West Bengal MLAs 2006–2011
Communist Party of India politicians from West Bengal
Communist Party of India candidates in the 2014 Indian general election
People from Paschim Medinipur district
1948 births